Geina sheppardi, or Sheppard's plume moth, is a moth of the family Pterophoridae. It known from western North America, including Mississippi, Ontario and Wisconsin.

The wingspan is about 15 mm. Adults are on wing from May to June. There is one generation per year.

The larvae feed on Vitis species. They make ties in young leaves. Full-grown caterpillars are about 10 mm long, pale green and hairy.

References

External links

Oxyptilini
Moths described in 1989